Matthew Phillips (born April 6, 1998) is a Canadian professional ice hockey right wing playing for the Calgary Wranglers in the American Hockey League (AHL) as a prospect to the Calgary Flames of the National Hockey League (NHL).

Playing career

Junior
Phillips was drafted in the second round, 33rd overall by the Victoria Royals in the 2013 WHL Bantam Draft. The season prior to being drafted, Phillips scored forty goals and 77 points in 37 games played with the Calgary Bisons of the Alberta Major Bantam Hockey League (AMBHL). Phillips participated in the Royals' training camp and preseason for the 2013–14 WHL season as a 15-year old, despite not being eligible to play in the regular season, as WHL rules prevent players under the age of 16 from playing. He was subsequently returned to his minor ice hockey team, the Alberta Midget Hockey League (AMHL) Calgary Buffaloes, where he finished the season with fifteen goals and 35 points in 33 games played.

Phillips joined the Royals' training camp and preseason for the 2014–15 WHL season, but was again returned to his minor ice hockey team in Calgary. Playing with the AMHL Calgary Buffaloes for the second straight season, Phillips was leading the league in scoring when he was called up to the Royals. Phillips made his Western Hockey League debut for the Royals on January 23, 2015 against the Kamloops Blazers, scoring one goal in a 4–3 overtime loss. He played one more game during the 2014–15 WHL season, finishing with three points in two games played, before being returned to the Buffaloes. He finished his second season with the Buffaloes winning the Harry Allen Memorial Trophy as the top scorer in the AMHL with 33 goals and 73 points in 34 games played. He also won the Trevor Linden Trophy as the league's top forward and was named to the AMHL First All-Star Team.

Professional

On December 31, 2017, Phillips signed a three-year, $2.325 million entry-level contract with the Calgary Flames. Philips made his National Hockey League debut with the Flames on May 19, 2021 against the Vancouver Canucks, finishing the game with two shots on goal in 14:19 of ice time in a 6–2 victory.

On August 8, 2021, Phillips signed a one-year, two-way contract extension with the Flames worth $750,000 at the NHL level.

Career statistics

Awards and honours

References

External links
 

1998 births
Living people
Calgary Flames draft picks
Calgary Flames players
Calgary Wranglers players
Canadian ice hockey centres
Ice hockey people from Calgary
Stockton Heat players
Victoria Royals players